"Take Back the Night" is a song recorded by American singer-songwriter Justin Timberlake for his fourth studio album, The 20/20 Experience – 2 of 2 (2013). It was written and produced by Timberlake, Timothy "Timbaland" Mosley and Jerome "J-Roc" Harmon, with additional writing from James Fauntleroy. The song was released on July 12, 2013, by RCA Records, as the lead single from The 20/20 Experience – 2 of 2. "Take Back the Night" is a disco and R&B song that lyrically addresses a potential love interest.

Commercially, the song reached the top-forty in most countries. The song gathered controversies with the Take Back the Night Foundation, an anti-rape organization, who expressed concerns about the similarities between the song's title and the organization's name.

Release 
While releasing and promoting The 20/20 Experience, Timberlake revealed that he only released half of the album and that the second half of The 20/20 Experience was going to be released later in 2013. However, it was revealed the same day that the second part would be released in November. On July 10, 2013, Timberlake posted a 45-second video on his official YouTube channel. In the video, Timberlake is seen hopping out of a convertible holding several white signs in his right hand. The signs list the various release dates of Timberlake's 2013 releases – "Suit & Tie January 14th", "Mirrors February 11th" and "The 20/20 Experience March 19th".

The next card reads "Take Back the Night", while the final card displays a blurred-out sign that was presumed to be its release date. Timberlake then walks into a club and a 10-second snippet of the song is played. The video closes with a message that reads: "The 20/20 Experience Continues..." Jason Lipshutz of Billboard was confused by the announcement, stating that if "Take Back the Night" is a new single, "it will blow by 'Tunnel Vision' which was bestowed with a controversial music video last week but has not yet been promoted to radio as the third official single from The 20/20 Experience." Two days later, on July 12, the full audio for "Take Back the Night" was posted to Timberlake's YouTube channel at noon Eastern time. The song was offered as a free download with a pre-order of The 20/20 Experience: 2 of 2 on the iTunes Store on the same date.

Controversy 
Shortly after the song was released, the Take Back the Night Foundation, an anti-rape organization, expressed concerns about the similarities between the song's title and the organization's name. Executive director of the foundation Katherine Koestner was critical of the lyrics, telling Radar Online that "The lyrics are definitely very sexual and not at all clearly anti-sexual violence. 'Use me,' for example, is not a great phrase for anyone affiliated with the organization." Take Back the Night sent Timberlake's lawyers a letter detailing their concerns. Shortly after that, the singer apologized saying that he was unaware of the organization and has come forward to support them, "I wanted to take this opportunity to let all know that neither my song nor its lyrics have any association with the organization. As I’ve learned more about the Take Back the Night Foundation, I’m moved by its efforts to stop violence against women, create safe communities and encourage respectful relationships for women—Something we all should rally around." The anti-rape organization, for their part, has decided not to pursue any suit against the singer, with Koestner saying, "At this point, we’re going to bow down gracefully, and accept that fighting this in court probably isn't the best use of anyone's time."

Music and lyrics 

"Take Back the Night" is a disco and R&B song, with a length of five minutes and fifty-five seconds. It carries a "sleek, rhythmic pop production", with instrumentation consisting of stirring strings, percolating percussion horn stabs, thumping bass and waka-waka guitars. Jason Lipshutz of Billboard wrote that the song "nods to Off the Wall-era Michael Jackson", while MTV News' James Montgomery declared "Take Back the Night" a "sumptuous slice" of "Off the Wall-indebted disco" that seems "custom-made for roller rinks everywhere (or at least the five that are still open for business in 2013)". The song contains a "dizzyingly light hook". Similarly, a reviewer of Spin wrote that the song has a distinct Jackson vibe, "throwing back to soul's post-disco evolution, infusing dance floor rhythms with impeccable class." According to Lipshutz the song is also a "souped-up version" of "Let the Groove Get In".

According to Lipshutz, "Take Back the Night" contains "little lyrical purpose aside from provoking its listener to move". Timberlake sings of trying to woo a would-be lover: "Girl, this was your city/You did it all and more/Broke every law except for one, babe: attraction". During the chorus, "he gets a little more direct", begging the object of his affection to join him on the dance floor: "Your love's a weapon/Give your body some direction/that's my aim/And we can take back the night". During its outro, it contains staccato-ed guitars and blasts of horns, each of which is announced by Timberlake.

Critical reception 
"Take Back the Night" received mixed to positive reviews from music critics. A reviewer of Fact wrote, "Horn-addled and packed with the kind of effortless swagger the singer exudes so well, 'Take Back the Night' will no doubt field comparisons to prime-era Michael Jackson, and that’s no bad thing at all." The comparison was echoed by Spin, and New York Post both of whom reacted favourably to the song. Writing for Vulture, Amanda Dobbins praised the "poorly named, pretty fun single" for being "a solid one, with a heavy disco vibe and the all-important handclaps" but also frowned upon its length. Lewis Corner of Digital Spy gave the song 3 stars out of 5 in a review that observed: "While the final result won't have us running off to dust down the disco ball and whip out the flared trousers, its subtle funk is enough to keep our attention firmly focussed on what's to come."

Melinda Newman of HitFix wrote that the song is more accessible and "poppier" than the experimental material on The 20/20 Experience, "but still feels like a cousin to some of the material on that album, in part because of the beats and producer Timbaland’s delightful reliance of staccato horns punctuating certain verses." Mikael Wood of the Los Angeles Times gave the song a mixed review, describing it as a "weak outtake from The 20/20 Experience; it's plush but not luxurious, funky but not propulsive". Taylor Balkom in his The Daily Reveille review graded the song a C+, writing "the song is only okay ... it isn't anything we haven't heard before."  Slant Magazine's Eric Henderson was also rather critical of the song, perceiving it to be an "(intentional?) cognitive dissonance centering a blockbuster club ode to hedonism around a phrase everyone knows means "do not rape.""

Commercial performance 
"Take Back the Night" reached the top-forty positions in most countries. In the United States, "Take Back the Night" debuted at number 47, before climbing eight spots to number 39. Eventually, the song reached a peak of number 29, becoming Timberlake's lowest charting-single in the United States. The song was a little better on the Pop Songs chart, debuting at number 20, becoming the greatest gainer of the week, and on the Hot R&B/Hip-Hop Songs chart, where it reached the top-ten, becoming his sixth top-ten on the R&B charts. In the United Kingdom, the song also failed to reach the top-twenty, peaking at number 22, remaining one of his lowest charting solo singles, only losing to "Tunnel Vision".

In Ireland, the song missed the top-forty, only reaching number 49, while in Germany, the song only peaked at number 52. In France, the song was his only single to miss the top-forty, only peaking at number 85. In Switzerland, "Take Back the Night" became Timberlake's lowest charting solo single, only reaching number 48 - his lowest was 2003's "I'm Lovin' It", with a peak of number 47.

Live performances 
Timberlake performed the song live for the first time at the Wireless Festival on July 12, 2013. On August 25, 2013, Timberlake also performed the song at the 2013 MTV Video Music Awards at Barclays Center as part of a medley. The song is featured on Timberlake's 2013/14 The 20/20 Experience World Tour.

Music video 
The music video for "Take Back the Night" was shot on July 18, 2013 in New York City. In the video, Timberlake walks the streets of Chinatown and performs in a black-and-white outfit on the sidewalk. In another scene, he is seen riding in a "classic car" during the night. The "Take Back the Night" video was directed by Jeff Nicholas, Jonathan Craven and Darren Craig. According to a press release, the video "harkens back to the days when nightlife ruled the city and beckons everyone within earshot that the night holds endless possibilities." Beginning on July 30 at 7am, fans can visit a custom website for a "virtual journey throughout New York City", which will offer fun facts about the music video. Twitter hashtags will be incorporated to enhance the experience.

Track listings 

CD single
"Take Back the Night" (Album Version) — 5:53
"Take Back the Night" (Radio Edit) — 4:33

Digital download
"Take Back the Night" — 5:55

Credits and personnel 
Credits adapted from the liner notes of "Take Back the Night" CD single.
Locations
Vocals recorded and mixed at Jungle City Studios in New York City, New York
Personnel

Timothy "Timbaland" Mosley – producer, songwriter
Justin Timberlake – Mixer, producer, songwriter, vocal producer, vocal arranger
Jerome "J-Roc" Harmon – keyboards, producer, songwriter
James Fauntleroy – songwriter
Chris Godbey – engineer, mixer
Jimmy Douglass – mixer
Alejandro Baima – assistant engineer
Elliot Ives – guitar
Benjamin Wright & The Benjamin Wright Orchestra – horns
Terry Santiel – percussion
Dave Kutch – mastering engineer

Charts

Weekly charts

Year-end charts

Release history

References 

Songs about nights
2013 singles
Justin Timberlake songs
Song recordings produced by Jerome "J-Roc" Harmon
Song recordings produced by Justin Timberlake
Song recordings produced by Timbaland
Songs written by James Fauntleroy
Songs written by Jerome "J-Roc" Harmon
Songs written by Justin Timberlake
Songs written by Timbaland
2013 songs
RCA Records singles
American disco songs
Music controversies